Marmaduke Matthews  (29 August 1837 – 24 September 1913) was an English-Canadian painter, born in Barcheston, Warwickshire, England.

Career
Matthews studied watercolour painting at Oxford, England before moving to Toronto, Canada in 1860 to embark on a career as an painter of landscape. He was hired by the Canadian Pacific Railway to paint the Canadian prairies and rocky mountains. He worked for William van Horne, then-president of the Canadian Pacific Railway, and made several cross-country trips to Canada's west, including in 1887, 1889 and 1892. He reportedly drew his sketches from the cowcatcher of a locomotive.

He is also notable for playing a founding role in the Ontario Society of Artists and the Royal Canadian Academy of Arts as a watercolour painter. In Toronto, he is affectionately remembered as the creator of Wychwood Park in 1874 - a plot of land that he once lived on, that became an artists' community and is now one of the higher-income neighbourhoods located northwest of downtown Toronto. 

Matthews died in Toronto on 24 September 1913. His works are included in the permanent collection of the National Gallery of Canada, the Art Gallery of Ontario, and the Robert McLaughlin Gallery.

References

Bibliography 

English artists
1837 births
1913 deaths
People from Warwickshire (before 1974)
Members of the Royal Canadian Academy of Arts
19th-century Canadian male artists